Glorimari Jaime Rodríguez is a Puerto Rican politician and former Mayor of Guayama. Jaime is affiliated with the New Progressive Party (PNP) and served as mayor from 2009 to 2013. She has a Masters in computer and law with a specialization in human rights of the University Complutense of Madrid. Completed a Juris doctor from the Eugenio María de Hostos School of Law in Mayaguez, Puerto Rico. Jaime made history by becoming the first ever women elected mayor in that city and also by becoming the first person elected as mayor from the New Progressive Party of Puerto Rico in Guayama. One of the things Glorimari was most focus on was making Guayama a modernized 21st century city, she created and remodeled schools and landmarks around the city which were abandoned and also created new ones so the city could grow more in tourism, economy, and modern beauty. During her administration she built historic landmarks and increased economy and tourism. Glorimari was the first mayor and politician in the world to give away 10,000 tablets to students in schools. She created some controversy and did not have a smooth time in office but still she went down as one of the most historic Mayors of all time in Guayama, Puerto Rico and the world.

References

Living people
Complutense University of Madrid alumni
Mayors of places in Puerto Rico
New Progressive Party (Puerto Rico) politicians
People from Guayama, Puerto Rico
Puerto Rican women in politics
Women mayors of places in Puerto Rico
Year of birth missing (living people)